The 6th World Cup season began in December 1971 in Switzerland and concluded in March 1972 in France.  Gustav Thöni of Italy won his second of three consecutive overall titles.  Annemarie Pröll of Austria won the women's overall title, her second of five consecutive.

A break in the schedule in February was for the 1972 Winter Olympics in Sapporo, Japan.  Prior to the Olympics, International Olympic Committee head Avery Brundage succeeded in having two-time men's overall World Cup champion Karl Schranz reclassified as a professional and therefore ineligible for the Olympics.  Schranz retired from amateur competition immediately thereafter and joined the professional skiing tour in 1973.

The controversy over "professionalism" (based on endorsements, manufacturers' fees, et cetera) continued for two more seasons,  and served to limit both participation and the number of events on the World Cup circuit.  Prior to the 1975 season, Brundage's successor Lord Killanin led an effort that changed the rule to permit such payments to be made to national associations, which generally eliminated such disputes.

Calendar

Men

Note:For the first time, the Olympic events no longer counted in the World Cup standings.

Ladies

Note: for the first time, the Olympic events no longer counted in the World Cup standings.

Men

Overall 

In Men's Overall World Cup 1971/72 the best five downhills, best five giant slaloms and best five slaloms count. Four racers had a point deduction. Gustav Thöni won the cup with only one win!

Downhill 

In Men's Downhill World Cup 1971/72 the best 5 results count.

Giant Slalom 

In Men's Giant Slalom World Cup 1970/71 the best 5 results count. Gustav Thöni won the cup with only one win. He won his third Giant Slalom World Cup in a row!

Slalom 

In Men's Slalom World Cup 1971/72 the best 5 results count.

Ladies

Overall 

In Women's Overall World Cup 1971/72 the best five downhills, best five giant slaloms and best five slaloms count. Three racers had a point deduction. Annemarie Pröll won eight races and was only unable to score points in four slaloms.

Downhill 

In Women's Downhill World Cup 1971/72 the best 5 results count. Annemarie Pröll won the cup with maximum points.

Giant Slalom 

In Women's Giant Slalom World Cup 1971/72 the best 5 results count. She won the cup by winning three races. All other events were won by French athletes.

Slalom 

In Women's Slalom World Cup 1971/72 the best 5 results count. No racer had a point deduction. Britt Lafforgue won the cup with only four results.

Nations Cup

Overall

Men

Ladies

Medal table

References

External links
FIS-ski.com - World Cup standings - 1972

FIS Alpine Ski World Cup
Alpine Skiing World Cup, 1972
Alpine Skiing World Cup, 1972